Alford Town was a railway station on the East Lincolnshire Railway which served the town of Alford in Lincolnshire between 1848 and 1970. It originally opened as Alford, but was renamed in 1923. When passenger services were withdrawn in 1970 the line through the station was closed.

History
This section was the last to be completed in September 1848 at an agreed cost of £123,000 (£ in ). The station was served by the Alford and Sutton Tramway to Sutton-on-Sea from 2 April 1884 to 7 December 1889.

Access was had through a three-arch portico entrance which led to a passageway to the up platform, a large parcels office and the booking office. The southern end of the station comprised the stationmaster's quarters and the ladies' waiting room. Twin facing platforms were provided; a general waiting room, storeroom, stationmaster's office and porter's room were located on the up platform. The platforms were initially covered by a roof which was subsequently replaced after the Second World War. A signal box was situated on the up side next to the road crossing to the north-west of the station. Behind the up platform lay a goods yard with a loading dock, goods shed capable to taking 9 wagons which also served as a grain store and a 15-ton crane. The shed and crane were destroyed during a bombing raid in the Second World War, which led to Alford's only wartime casualty: the shunt horse driver who was on fire watch in the yard.

The July 1922 timetable saw seven up and six down weekday services, plus one Sunday service each way, call at Alford. By 1953, Alford was dealing with 50-60 passenger and goods trains per day. These included ironstone trains from the High Dyke area of Lincoln (see Woolsthorpe-by-Colsterworth) to the Frodingham Ironworks, and coal trains from Colwick.  The station was closed to goods traffic on 2 May 1966 and to passengers on 5 October 1970.

Present day
The trackbed is partly the driveway to a new house next to the site of a former level crossing. The station building is now part of the aptly named Beeching's Way Industrial Estate. The main buildings were, in 1995, occupied by John White (Alford) Printers, which used a workshop erected across part of the trackbed and abutting the station building. The remaining section of the trackbed to the rear of the station has been infilled and used as a car park. The platform roof has been removed In 2009, the station building and attached industrial unit were sold to Jackson's Building Centres and reopened as building suppliers. The station building has been extensively restored externally.

References

Sources

External links
 Alford Town station on navigable 1946 O.S. map
 Alford Town station during its last week of operation

Disused railway stations in Lincolnshire
Railway stations in Great Britain closed in 1970
Railway stations in Great Britain opened in 1848
Former Great Northern Railway stations
Beeching closures in England
1848 establishments in England
Alford, Lincolnshire